Sung Jung-A (born 25 December 1965 in Jinju, Gyeongsangnam-do) is a South Korean former basketball player who won the silver medal in the women's basketball tournament at the 1984 Summer Olympics.

Sung was also a member of the South Korean junior national basketball team that won the silver medal at the inaugural FIBA Under-19 World Championship for Women in 1985.

Sung also competed in 1988 Summer Olympics where South Korea finished 7th with a record of 2–3.

Personal life
Her son, Lee Hyun-jung is a South Korean college basketball player for the Davidson Wildcats of the Atlantic 10 Conference.

References

External links
Sung Jung-A at FIBA (1988 Olympic Games)
A. Yung at FIBA (1985 U-19 World Championship)
Seong Jeong-A at Basketball-Reference.com
Sung Jung-A at DatabaseOlympics.com

1965 births
Living people
South Korean women's basketball players
Olympic basketball players of South Korea
Basketball players at the 1984 Summer Olympics
Basketball players at the 1988 Summer Olympics
Olympic silver medalists for South Korea
Olympic medalists in basketball
Asian Games medalists in basketball
Basketball players at the 1982 Asian Games
Basketball players at the 1986 Asian Games
Basketball players at the 1990 Asian Games
Medalists at the 1984 Summer Olympics
Asian Games gold medalists for South Korea
Asian Games silver medalists for South Korea
Medalists at the 1982 Asian Games
Medalists at the 1986 Asian Games
Medalists at the 1990 Asian Games
People from Jinju
Sportspeople from South Gyeongsang Province